The gens Cincia was a plebeian family at Rome.  The first member of the gens to achieve prominence was Lucius Cincius Alimentus, who was elected praetor in 209 BC.

Praenomina used by the gens
The Cincii are known to have used the praenomina Lucius, Marcus, Gaius, and Publius, all of which were amongst the most common names throughout Roman history.

Branches and cognomina of the gens
The only prominent family of the Cincii bore the cognomen Alimentus, presumably derived from alimentum, "food", suggesting that the ancestors of the family may have been cooks.  Other cognomina of the Cincii included Faliscus, a Faliscan, Salvius, an Oscan praenomen, and Severus, a common surname meaning "grave, serious," or "severe".  Several Cincii are mentioned without a surname.

Members of the gens
 Lucius Cincius Alimentus, praetor in 209 BC, received the province of Sicily; a celebrated annalist and jurist, sometimes identified with a more obscure Cincius who was an antiquarian probably in the time of Augustus.
 Marcus Cincius Alimentus, tribune of the plebs in 204 BC, proposed the Cincia Lex de Donis et Muneribus, also called the Lex Cincia or Muneralis Lex, concerning the compensation of lawyers.
 Marcus Cincius, praefect of Pisae in 194 BC, wrote to the senate to inform them of an insurrection of the Ligures.  He may be the same as Marcus Cincius Alimentus, tribunus plebis in 204 BC.
 Lucius Cincius, the procurator or bailiff of Atticus, frequently mentioned in Cicero's letters.
 Cincius, entrusted with the government of Syria in AD 63, during the government of Corbulo.

See also
 List of Roman gentes

Footnotes

Roman gentes